San Rafael Obrajuelo  is a municipality in the department of  La Paz, El Salvador. As of 2017 it was estimated to have  a population of 11,403.

History 

According to the report of the Intendent of San Salvador Antonio Gutiérrez y Ulloa, in 1807 the estate of Obrajuelo, belonging to the Marquess of Aycinena existed. A prosperous settlement formed in the former state of Aycinena.

In mid-nineteenth century, the settlement had achieved notable commercial activity and retained the population required by law to form a new municipality. By the Legislative Decree of March 7, 1882, a town was erected under the name of San Rafael. Although the ereccional decree does not mention it, the new municipality founded in Obrajuelo and San Pedro Martir cantons, jurisdiction of San Juan Nonualco, its naming was considered a tribute for President Rafael Zaldívar, and performed during his tenure.

On March 30 of the same year, residents of the new municipality elected their first authorities, chaired by the provincial governor. On 1890, it had a popopulation of 900. Lately, out of habit, it has been called San Rafael Obrajuelo.

Information 

The municipality has an area of 11.01 km², with an elevation of 150 mamsl and 50 km away from San Salvador.

It is divided administratively in urban neighborhoods: San José, El Calvario, Concepción, El Centro, Nueva Alianza, and Las Delicias.

It is divided in cantons:

 El Carao
 La Longaniza
 La Palma
 San Jerónimo
 San José Obrajuelo
 San Pedro Martir

It also has 13 villages: El Centro, El Flor, Los Obrajes, San Jerónimo, Los Paredes, Los Realegeños, Los Alvarado, El Molino, Puente La Chaquina, San Miguel Obrajuelo, El Cobanal, La Palma, and Autopista

By 2015, it receives an allocation from FODES of $679,936.80.

The festivities are celebrated from October 10 through October 24 in honor of its patron St. Raphael Archangel.

Sports
The local professional football club is named C.D. Maracaná San Rafael and it currently plays in the Salvadoran Third Division.

References 

Municipalities of the La Paz Department (El Salvador)

http://citypopulation.info/php/elsalvador-admin.php?adm2id=0819

https://lapaztimes.com/alcalde-de-san-rafael-obrajuelo-hoy-inicia-una-nueva-era-de-transparencia-y-desarrollo-para-todo-el-municipio/?amp=1